Conraua crassipes is a species of frog in the family Conrauidae. It is found in eastern Nigeria, Cameroon, Equatorial Guinea (including the island of Bioko), Gabon, the Republic of the Congo, and the Democratic Republic of the Congo. Presumably it also occurs in the southwestern Central African Republic and in the Cabinda Enclave of Angola. Common name Abo slippery frog has been coined for it.

It tolerates some habitat degradation, provided that trees remain and the habitat does not become too open. It is adversely affected by the loss of its forest habitat for agriculture, logging and human settlements, and sedimentation of its breeding streams. It occurs in several protected areas.

References

Conraua
Frogs of Africa
Amphibians of West Africa
Amphibians of Cameroon
Amphibians of the Democratic Republic of the Congo
Amphibians of Equatorial Guinea
Amphibians of Gabon
Amphibians of the Republic of the Congo
Taxa named by Reinhold Wilhelm Buchholz
Taxa named by Wilhelm Peters
Amphibians described in 1875
Taxonomy articles created by Polbot